The Koigab River is an ephemeral river on Namibia Skeleton Coast. Its source is in the Grootberg Mountains near Bergsig, where its two inflows, the Gui-Tsawisib and the Springbok are located.

References

Rivers of Namibia
Geography of Kunene Region